(Pierre Joseph) Auguste Bravard (18 June 1803 – 28 March 1861) was a French mining engineer turned palaeontologist. He hunted fossils in the Vaucluse, Allier and his native Puy de Dôme.

Biography
Bravard emigrated to Argentina in the winter of 1852-53 and was a long-term resident in Buenos Aires. He unearthed and studied mammalian fossils, some of which, like the skull of Mesotherium, were sent back to the Muséum d'histoire naturelle, Paris. Pleistocene mammal fossils purchased from Bravard are also in the Museum of Natural History, South Kensington, London, transferred from the British Museum, which had purchased them from Bravard in 1854. Bravard, who became director of the natural history museum in Paraná, upheld geological theories contrary to those of Charles Darwin.

From Buenos Aires, he explored in Bahía Blanca, resulting in his Mapa geológico y topográfico de los alrededores de Bahía Blanca, Buenos Aires (1857).  He also explored the Paraná basin and the pampas.

Periodically Bravard lithographed his letters and distributed them to geologists in Europe.

After his unexpected death in the Mendoza earthquake of 1861, his remarkable collection of fossils disappeared. At the turn of the twentieth century, an auction of unclaimed crates by the Buenos Aires customs office revealed the collection, which was handed over to the Museo Nacional de Ciencias Naturales, Buenos Aires.

At Issoire, he is commemorated in the rue August Bravard.

Works
 Catalogue des especes d'animaux fossiles recuilies dans I'Amerique du Sud (1852-1856)
 Observaciones geológicas sobre diferentes terrenos de transporte de la hoya del Plata (1857)
 Estado físico del territorio. Geología de las Pampas (1858)
 Carta geológica de la Provincia de Entre Ríos (1858)
 Monografía de los terrenos marinos terciarios de las cercanías del Paraná (1858)

Notes

References

1803 births
1861 deaths
People from Issoire
French paleontologists
French emigrants to Argentina
French mining engineers
People from Buenos Aires
Deaths in earthquakes
Natural disaster deaths in Argentina